The Throne of Solomon is the throne of King Solomon in the Hebrew Bible, and is a motif in Judaism, Christianity and Islam.

The throne as Solomon's seat of state is described in 1 Kings 10:

Hebrew Bible
The term "throne" is used both literally and metonymically in the Hebrew Bible. 

As a symbol for kingship, the throne is seen as belonging to David, or to God Himself. In 1 Kings 1:37 Benaiah's blessing to Solomon was "may the LORD... make his throne greater than the throne of my lord king David"; while in 1 Chronicles 29:23 we are told "Solomon sat on the throne of the LORD as king".

According to I Kings 7:7, Solomon's throne was placed in the Porch of Judgment, being actually an audience chamber where the king sat in judgment. Its floors were paved with cedar wood. In the Aramaic translation it is described as being an anteroom or vestibule, called "porch of the pillars."

Judaism
A Jewish tradition holds that the throne was removed to Babylon, then Ahasuerus sat on the throne of Solomon. Another tradition holds that six steps related to six terms for the earth. According to the Targum Sheni of Megillat Esther, Solomon's throne was one of the earliest mechanical devices invented, with movable parts. When it was transferred to Persia some centuries later and used in the palace of Ahasuerus, it ceased to work. It has been described as a throne overlaid with gold, and studded with jewels; emeralds, cat's eye, the Baghdadi onyx, pearls and marble. It was ascended by many steps, the sides of which were aligned with twelve sculptured lions of gold, before whom were golden sculptures of eagles, the right paw of each lion set opposite the left wing of each eagle. As one approached the top of the staircase, there were another six steps directly in front of the semi-circular throne, each step with a pair of sculpted animals, each in gold; the first step having a couching bull opposite a lion; the second a wolf on its haunches opposite a sheep; the third a panther opposite a camel; the fourth an eagle opposite a peacock; the fifth a wildcat opposite a cock; the sixth a hawk opposite a pigeon. Above the throne was a seven-branched candlestick which afforded light, each branch bearing a sculpted image of the seven patriarchs: Adam (the first man), Noah, Shem, Abraham, Isaac, Jacob, and Job among them.

Above the throne was also a sculpted design showing seventy golden seats upon which sat the seventy members of the Sanhedrin, adjudicating in the presence of King Solomon. At the two sides of King Solomon's ears were fixed two fish of the sea. At the very top of Solomon's throne were fixed twenty-four golden wings that provided a protective shade and covering for the king, and whenever the king wished to ascend his throne, the bull on the first step would, by a movable, mechanical contraption, outstretch its forearm and place the king upon the second step, and so-forth, until he ascended the sixth step, upon which ascension mechanical eagles then descended and lifted-up the king, placing him upon his throne.

Christendom 

The New Testament speaks only of the "throne of David," as in the angel Gabriel's message in Luke 1:32 in relation to the Davidic line, and notably the Gospel of Luke gives the descent of Jesus via Nathan (son of David), not Solomon. In religious tradition the Seat of Wisdom in Roman Catholic tradition is associated with Solomon, and in art, such as the Lucca Madonna (van Eyck), which portrays the Virgin sitting on the throne of Solomon.

A "Throne of Solomon" was also among the Solomonic objects of the Byzantine Court at Constantinople.

The Throne of Charlemagne, or Royal Throne at Aachen (Aachener Königsthron) is a throne erected in the 790s by Charlemagne, as one of the fittings of his palatine chapel in Aachen. Until 1531, it served as the throne of the coronation of the Holy Roman Emperors and the King of the Romans, being used at a total of thirty-one coronations. As a result, especially in the eleventh century, it was referred to as the totius regni archisolum ("Archstool of the Whole Realm"). Charlemagne himself was not crowned on this throne, but instead in the Old St. Peter's Basilica in Rome by Pope Leo III. The throne was modeled after the throne of Solomon. 

The Throne Chair of Denmark was also inspired by the throne of Solomon.

Various depictions in sacred art such as stained glass windows, frescoes, and paintings depict the throne and the king.

Islam
The throne of Solomon featured both in Islamic commentary, and art, including mosque decoration.

The concept has given rise to various geographical names:
 Ghasre Abu-Nasr (Abu-Nasr Palace) or Takht e Sulayman (Throne of Solomon), archeological remains in Shiraz, Iran
 Takht-e Soleyman District (بخش تخت سلیمان, meaning the "Throne of Solomon"), district in West Azerbaijan, Iran
 Takht-e Soleymān (تخت سلیمان, Takht-e Soleymān, "Throne of Solomon") archaeological site in West Azarbaijan, Iran
 Takht-e-Sulaiman Solomon's Throne (Urdu, Pashto : تخت سليمان, from Persian : "Solomon 's throne") peak in Khyber Pakhtunkhwa, Pakistan 
 Takht-e-Sulaiman, Sulayman Mountain, peak in Osh, Kyrgyzstan
 Throne of Solomon (Srinagar), Takht-i-Sulaiman, temple ruin near Dal Lake, Shrinagar associated with Ahmadi claims of Jesus in India.

The Peacock Throne of Shah Jahan was commissioned to underscore his position as the just king.

Dar al-Hadith (Kursi Sulaiman) or Station of King Solomon
This is most likely a memorial that was probably built to commemorate the Prophet Sulaiman (biblical Solomon). It is located within the Temple Mount plaza, which supports its eastern wall. Kursi, which means chair, is an odd name for a building, and possibly relates to the spur of the Rock against which it is erected. The building itself is undated, but is clearly a mid-16th century foundation, as the shape of the two shallow domes covering the building are associated with the Ottoman period.

The facade of Sulaiman's tomb in al-Aqsa enclave. Additionally, a cavetto frieze situated above the mihrab is identical to one found over the mihrab in the al-'Imara al-'Amira complex (959/1552), suggesting that Kursi Sulaiman (the 'throne of Solomon') was built around that time. The building has three facades visible from the Temple Mount and the eastern facade is integrated in the eastern wall of Haram al-Sharif compound. A marble slab inspect over the main northern entrance to the structure reads the first verse of Surah Isra mentioning the Night Journey of prophet Muhammad. It was decorated with Surah Neml Verse 30 “Indeed, it is from Solomon, and indeed, it reads: 'In the name of Allah, the Entirely Merciful, the Especially Merciful”.

The building has a large hall divided into different areas, one of which is the prayer area with a mihrab. It is surmounted by two shallow domes. The hall also includes a symbolic tomb which might allude to the tomb of Sulaiman or his throne. The building is presently used as an institute for Hadith.

See also
 Walls of Jerusalem National Park with Solomon's Throne peak 
 Takht-e-Soleiman (disambiguation)

References

Further reading

Myres, David, "A Grammar of Architectural Ornament in Ottoman Jerusalem", in Auld, S. & R. Hillenbrand, Ottoman Jerusalem, The Living City 1517–1917, Part II, 2000, pp. 1087–1109.

Auld, S. & R. Hillenbrand, : Ottoman Jerusalem. The Living City 1517–1917, The British School of Archaeology in Jerusalem, Altajir World of Islam Trust, (2000).

Chair of Solomon (الكرسي سليمان). Retrieved April 11, 2019, from http://islamicart.museumwnf.org/database_item.php?id=monument;ISL;pa;Mon01;10;ar

External links 

Thrones
Books of Kings
Christian iconography
Solomon